Padar is a rural locality (a selo) in Derbentsky District, Republic of Dagestan, Russia. The population was 2,266 as of 2010. There are 17 streets.

Geography 
Padar is located 26 km northwest of Derbent (the district's administrative centre) by road. Velikent and Karadagly are the nearest rural localities.

Nationalities 
Azerbaijanis and Dargins live there.

References 

Rural localities in Derbentsky District